Center Theatre Group is a non-profit arts organization located in Los Angeles, California. It is one of the largest theatre companies in the nation, programming subscription seasons year-round at the Mark Taper Forum, the Ahmanson Theatre and the Kirk Douglas Theatre.

Center Theatre Group is led by Artistic Director Michael Ritchie and Managing Director/CEO Meghan Pressman.

Premieres include:
Me and Bessie
9 to 5
Angels in America
Biloxi Blues
Bloody Bloody Andrew Jackson
Children of a Lesser God
Curtains
Flower Drum Song (revival)
Smokey Joe's Cafe
The Drowsy Chaperone
Bengal Tiger at the Baghdad Zoo
Water and Power
Sleeping Beauty Wakes
13
Zoot Suit
Marjorie Prime
Chavez Ravine

Awards and nominations

External links
 Official website
 

League of Resident Theatres
Tony Award winners
Regional theatre in the United States
Theatre companies in Los Angeles
Performing groups established in 1967